The Metropolitan Borough of St Marylebone was a metropolitan borough of the County of London from 1900 to 1965.  It was based directly on the previously existing civil parish of St Marylebone, which was incorporated into the Metropolitan Board of Works area in 1855, retaining a parish vestry, and then became part of the County of London in 1889.

It was that part of the current City of Westminster which is north of Oxford Street, and east of Maida Vale and Edgware Road.  It included the areas Marylebone, Regent's Park, St John's Wood, and Lisson Grove, along with the western part of the district of Fitzrovia.  In 1965 it was abolished and its former area was amalgamated with that of the Metropolitan Borough of Paddington and the Metropolitan Borough of Westminster to form the City of Westminster.

Origins and arms 

The name is derived from a chapel, dedicated to St Mary, and founded by Barking Abbey, the holders of the Manor of Tyburn.  The chapel was named St Mary-le-Bourne, for the bourne, or River Tyburn.  In the borough's coat of arms, the blue and white waves represent this stream; the lily and rose, derived from Barking Abbey, represent the legend that when the Virgin's tomb was opened it was found to contain lilies and roses.

The motto: Fiat Secundum Verbatum Tuum, is from the Gospel of Luke Ch.I v.38 and translates as Be it according to Thy Word.

The arms were granted by the College of Arms on 17 August 1901.

Town hall 
Following a competition in 1911, Sir Edwin Cooper was commissioned to design Marylebone Town Hall. The building, in Marylebone Road was built 1914–20. The building is faced with Portland stone and is an example of Edwardian Graeco-Roman classicism, with a tower in the style of Christopher Wren and fluted columns. Cooper also designed the 1938–39 extension in a simpler style to house the public library.

Population and area 
The population found in the Census was:

St Marylebone Vestry 1801–1899

Metropolitan Borough 1900–1961

Politics 

Under the Metropolis Management Act 1855 any parish that exceeded 2,000 ratepayers was to be divided into wards; as such the incorporated vestry of Marylebone was divided into eight wards (electing vestrymen): No. 1 or Hamilton Terrace (9), No. 2 or St Johns Wood Terrace (9), No. 3 or New Church Street (15), No. 4 or Dorset Square & Regents Park (15), No. 5 or Bryanstone (18), No. 6 or Portman (18), No. 7 or Portland Place (18) and No. 8 or Cavendish Square (18).

The metropolitan borough was divided into nine wards for elections: Bryanston Square, Cavendish, Church Street, Dorset Square & Regent's Park, Hamilton Terrace, Langham, Park Crescent, Portman and St John's Wood Terrace.

Borough council

Parliament constituency 
For elections to Parliament, the borough was divided into two constituencies:
Marylebone East
Marylebone West
In 1918 the borough's representation was reduced to one seat:
St Marylebone

References

Further reading 
 

History of the City of Westminster
Metropolitan boroughs of the County of London
1900 establishments in the United Kingdom
1965 disestablishments in the United Kingdom
Districts abolished by the London Government Act 1963
Metropolitan Borough of